Below are the rosters for the 2001 FIFA World Youth Championship tournament in Argentina.

Players name marked in bold went on to earn full international caps.

Group A

Head coach:  José Pékerman

Head coach:  Shawky Gharieb

Head coach:  Kari Ukkonen

Head coach:  Wendell Downswell

Group B

Head coach:  Carlos César

Head coach:   Paul James

Stand-by players

Head coach:  Uli Stielike

Head coach:  Adnan Hamad

Group C

Head coach:  Héctor Pinto

Head coach:  Shen Xiangfu (沈祥福)

Head coach:  Wolfgang Suhnholz

Head coach:  Anatoli Kroschenko

Group D

Head coach:  Oliveira Gonçalves

Head coach:  Ange Postecoglou

Head coach:  Dušan Fitzel

Head coach:  Akihiro Nishimura

Group E

Head coach:  Carlos Watson

Head coach:  Fabián Burbano

Head coach:  Diego Garzitto

Head coach:  Louis van Gaal

Group F

Head coach:  Raymond Domenech

Head coach:  Emmanuel Afranie

Head coach:  Mehdi Monajati

Head coach:  Cristóbal Maldonado

Footnotes

External links
FIFA.com
squad list in text file

FIFA U-20 World Cup squads
Fifa World Youth Championship Squads, 2001